The Walter M601 is a turboprop aircraft engine produced by Walter Aircraft Engines of the Czech Republic. The company's first turboprop, the M601 is used in business, agricultural and military training aircraft.

Development

The turboprop was designed for use on the Let L-410 and the M601 first ran in 1967. It was not suitable for the prototype L-410 and the company developed an upgraded version, the M601A, with a slightly wider diameter.

Variants
M601A
Initial production variant for early version of the Let L410.
M601B
Production variant for the Let L410UVP.
M601D
Developed for the Let L410UVP.
M601D-1
Agricultural variant for high-cycle operation, used on the PZL Kruk and Ayres Thrush.
M601D-2
Special variant for paradrop aircraft, used on the Do 28 and some Finist conversions.
M601D-11
Agricultural and paradrop variant with a higher Time Between Overhaul of up to 1800 hours.
M601D-11NZ
Downrated variant for use in the FU-24 Fletcher.
M601E
Developed for the Let L410UVP-E.
M601E-11
General use engine with sub-variants of differing TBO.
M601E-11A
Variant of the 11 for use at higher operating altitudes and modified with a low pressure bleed air system for pressurised aircraft.
M601E-21
Variant for the L410-UVP-E used for hot and high operations.
M601F
Variant intended for use on the L420.
M601FS
M601F-11
M601F-22
M601F-32
M601FS
M601T
Aerobatic variant for use on the PZL Orlik.
M601H-80 now the GE Aviation Czech H80
M601Z
Agricultural variant for use on the Z-37T.

Applications
 Aerocomp Comp Air 7
 Ayres Thrush
 Lancair Propjet
 Let Z-37T - TurboČmelák (AgroTurbo)
 Let L-410 Turbolet
 Let L-420
 Myasishchev/SOKOL M-101T
 PAC FU-24 Fletcher
 Privateer Industries Privateer
 PZL-106 Kruk
 PZL-130 Orlik
 SMG-92 Turbo Finist
 Technoavia Rysachok
 Turbine Legend

Specification (M601D-1)

See also

References

External links

 Walter M601 page
 GE Completes Acquisition of WALTER AIRCRAFT ENGINES
 Walter M601 page on GE Aviation
 European Aviation Safety Agency - Type Certificate Data Sheet E.070 Walter M601 series 
 Walter M601D
 A Turbine in Every Cowling? Czech This Out: The Walter M601 turboprop

1960s turboprop engines
M601